Robin Belcher (born August 1, 1976) is a former Democratic member of the Ohio House of Representatives, representing the 10th District from May 2009 to December 2010. She was appointed to the seat when Eugene Miller left to fill a vacancy on Cleveland City Council.

Belcher earned a bachelor’s degree in political science from Bowling Green State University, Master’s degree in Public Administration from Ohio State University and a law degree from the University of Missouri, Columbia.

References

External links
Page on the Ohio House of Representatives website
Profile on the Ohio Ladies' Gallery website

Living people
African-American state legislators in Ohio
American women lawyers
Bowling Green State University alumni
Democratic Party members of the Ohio House of Representatives
African-American women in politics
Ohio lawyers
John Glenn College of Public Affairs alumni
Politicians from Cleveland
University of Missouri School of Law alumni
Women state legislators in Ohio
1976 births
21st-century American politicians
21st-century American women politicians
21st-century African-American women
21st-century African-American politicians
20th-century African-American people
20th-century African-American women